Events from the year 2003 in the United States.

Incumbents

Federal government 
 President: George W. Bush (R-Texas)
 Vice President: Dick Cheney (R-Wyoming)
 Chief Justice: William Rehnquist (Wisconsin) 
 Speaker of the House of Representatives: Dennis Hastert (R-Illinois)
 Senate Majority Leader: Tom Daschle (D-South Dakota) (until January 3), Bill Frist (R-Tennessee) (starting January 3)
 Congress: 107th (until January 3), 108th (starting January 3)

Events

January 
 January – Sky marshals are introduced on U.S. airlines in an attempt to prevent hijackings.
 January 3
 The 108th United States Congress is sworn in, including incoming freshmen Senators Saxby Chambliss (R-GA), Lindsey Graham (R-SC), John Sununu (R-NH), Lamar Alexander (R-TN), Elizabeth Dole (R-NC), Norm Coleman (R-MN), and Mark Pryor (D-AR).
 The Ohio State University defeats the University of Miami in double-overtime in the Fiesta Bowl, 31–24, for the national Bowl Championship Series (BCS) title.
 January 4 – In American football, the Atlanta Falcons defeat the Green Bay Packers in a 27–7 upset, handing the Packers their first ever playoff loss at Lambeau Field.
 January 8 – US Airways Express Flight 5481 crashes at Charlotte/Douglas International Airport in Charlotte, North Carolina, killing all 21 people aboard.
 January 15 – Eldred v. Ashcroft: The Supreme Court of the United States allows the extension of copyright terms in the U.S.
 January 16 – STS-107: Space Shuttle Columbia is launched on what turns out to be its last flight.
 January 23 – The last signal is received from NASA's Pioneer 10 spacecraft, some 7.5 billion miles from Earth.
 January 24 – The newly created United States Department of Homeland Security begins operations.
 January 25 – An international group of volunteers leaves London for Baghdad to act as voluntary human shields, hoping to avert a U.S. invasion.
 January 26 – Super Bowl XXXVII: The Tampa Bay Buccaneers defeat the Oakland Raiders 48–21.
 January 28 – State of the Union Address.
 January 30 – Iraq disarmament crisis: The leaders of the United Kingdom, Czech Republic, Denmark, Hungary, Italy, Poland, Portugal, Romania and Spain release a statement (The Letter of the Eight) demonstrating support for the United States' plans to invade Iraq.

February 

 February 1 – STS-107: Space Shuttle Columbia disintegrates over Texas upon re-entry, killing all seven astronauts on board.
 February 3 – John W. Snow is sworn in as the new Secretary of Treasury, succeeding Paul O'Neill.
 February 4 – Four-year-old Sofia Juarez disappears in Kennewick, Washington.
 February 5 – Iraq disarmament crisis: U.S. Secretary of State Colin Powell addresses the UN Security Council on Iraq.
 February 7 – An unsuccessful attempt is made to contact Pioneer 10.
 February 20 – The Station nightclub fire in West Warwick, Rhode Island claims the lives of 100 people.
 February 27 – Fred Rogers, host of the children's television show Mister Rogers Neighborhood, dies of stomach cancer at the age of 74.

March 
 March 1
 The Federal Law Enforcement Training Center, the United States Customs Service, and the United States Secret Service move to the United States Department of Homeland Security.
 The Turkish parliament vetoes U.S. troop access to airbases in Turkey in order to attack Iraq from the north. The Bush administration starts working on Plan B, namely attacking Iraq from the south, through the Persian Gulf.
 March 5 – Lockyer v. Andrade, Ewing v. California: In two separate opinions, the Supreme Court of the United States, by 5–4 margins, upholds California's "three strikes" law.
 March 11 – Iraq disarmament crisis: Iraqi fighters threaten two U.S. U-2 surveillance planes, on missions for U.N. weapons inspectors, forcing them to abort their mission and return to base.
 March 16 – Iraq disarmament crisis: The leaders of the United States, Britain, Portugal, and Spain meet at a summit in the Azores Islands. U.S. President Bush calls March 17 the "moment of truth", meaning that the "coalition of the willing" will make its final effort to extract a resolution from the U.N. Security Council, giving Iraq an ultimatum to disarm immediately or be disarmed by force.
 March 17 – Iraq disarmament crisis: U.S. President George W. Bush gives an ultimatum: Iraqi leader Saddam Hussein and his sons must either leave Iraq, or face military action at a time of the U.S.'s choosing.
 March 18
 FBI agents raid the corporate headquarters of HealthSouth Corporation in Birmingham, Alabama, on suspicion of massive corporate fraud led by the company's top executives.
 About $1 billion is taken from Iraq's Central Bank by Saddam Hussein and his family, just hours before the United States begins bombing Iraq.
 March 19 – The first American bombs drop on Baghdad after Iraqi President Saddam Hussein and his sons do not comply with U.S. President George W. Bush's 48-hour mandate demanding their exit from Iraq.
 March 20 – The US-led Iraq War begins.
 March 22 – The United States and the United Kingdom begin their shock and awe campaign, with a massive air strike on military targets in Baghdad.
 March 23
Hasan Akbar, a Muslim soldier with the 101st Airborne, kills two fellow soldiers in a grenade attack at Camp Pennsylvania, Kuwait.
 The 75th Academy Awards ceremony, hosted by Steve Martin, is held at Kodak Theatre in Hollywood. Rob Marshall's Chicago wins six awards out of 13 nominations, including Best Picture (the first musical to win the award since 1968's Oliver!). Roman Polanski wins Best Director for The Pianist, though he does not attend due to a long-standing arrest warrant. The telecast garners over 33 million viewers, making it the least-watched and lowest-rated televised Oscar ceremony so far.
 March 30 – Meigs Field Airport in Chicago, Illinois, is demolished overnight.

April 

 April 3 – U.S. forces seize control of Saddam International Airport, changing the airport's name to Baghdad International Airport.
 April 3–12 – Iraq War: US forces defeat the Iraqi Army and the Iraqi Republican Guard in the Battle of Baghdad.
 April 9 – Iraq War: U.S. forces seize control of Baghdad, ending the regime of Saddam Hussein.
 April 13
Iraq War: Saddam Hussein's hometown of Tikrit falls to U.S. forces.
 President George W. Bush accuses Syria of possessing chemical weapons.
 April 18 – Holes, directed by Andrew Davis is released in theaters.
 April 21 – Retired U.S. Army General Jay Garner becomes Interim Civil Administrator of Iraq.
 April 29 – Secretary of Defense Donald Rumsfeld confirms that U.S. troops will be withdrawn from Saudi Arabia where they have been stationed since the 1991 Gulf War.

May 

 May 1 – U.S. president George W. Bush lands on the aircraft carrier USS Abraham Lincoln, where he gives a speech announcing the end of major combat in the 2003 Invasion of Iraq. A banner behind him declares "Mission Accomplished".
 May 3 – The Old Man of the Mountain, a rock formation in New Hampshire, crumbles after heavy rain.
 May 4 – Top Thrill Dragster opens in Cedar Point in Sandusky, Ohio as the world's tallest, fastest roller coaster.
 May 4–10 – A major severe weather outbreak spawns more tornadoes than any week in U.S. history; 393 tornadoes are reported in 19 states.
 May 21 – Ruben Studdard wins season 2 of American Idol.
 May 23 – Dewey, the first deer cloned by scientists at Texas A&M University, is born.
 May 25 – After docking in Miami at 05:00, the SS Norway (old SS France) is severely damaged by a boiler explosion at 06:30, killing seven and injuring 17 crew members. A few weeks later it is announced by Norwegian Cruise Line that she will never sail again as a commercial ocean liner.
 May 28 – President George W. Bush authorizes $350 billion worth of tax cuts over 10 years.
 May 30 – Pixar Animation Studios' fifth feature film, Finding Nemo, is released in theaters, becoming the studio's biggest financial success up to that point.
 May 31 – Eric Rudolph, perpetrator of the Centennial Olympic Park bombing in 1996, is captured in Murphy, North Carolina.

June 
 June – As a result of the early 2000s recession, as well as the jobless recovery that followed, unemployment peaks at 6.3%, the highest since April 1994.
 June 4 – Martha Stewart and her broker are indicted for using privileged investment information and then obstructing a federal investigation. Stewart also resigns as chairperson and chief executive officer of Martha Stewart Living.
 June 14 – Ennis shootings: A gunman goes on a shooting spree in Madison County, Montana. The gunman kills one man and injures six others, before being involved in a chase and shootout with responding police. He is sentenced to 11 life terms, the longest prison sentence in Montana state history.
 June 19 – The U.S. Census Bureau announces that with 37 million, Hispanics constitute the largest minority in the USA (compared with 36 million African Americans).
 June 22 – The largest hailstone ever recorded falls in Aurora, Nebraska.
 June 23 – Grutter v. Bollinger: The Supreme Court of the United States upholds affirmative action in university admissions.
 June 26
 A senior Department of State chemical and biological weapons expert testifies to the House of Representatives Intelligence Committee that he was pressured to modify intelligence reports about Iraq.
 Lawrence v. Texas: The U.S. Supreme Court declares sodomy laws unconstitutional.
 June 29 – A balcony collapse in Chicago kills 13.
 June 30 – In Irvine, California, Joseph Hunter Parker kills two Albertsons employees with a sword, before being shot to death by the police.

July 
 July 8 – Douglas Williams goes on a shooting rampage in a Lockheed Martin plant in Meridian, Mississippi, killing six and injuring eight before committing suicide.
 July 9 – Pirates of the Caribbean: The Curse of the Black Pearl, directed by Gore Verbinski, is released in theaters as the first film in the Pirates of the Caribbean film Series.
 July 14 – CIA leak scandal: The Washington Post columnist Robert Novak publishes the name of Valerie Plame, blowing her cover as a CIA operative.
 July 22 – Uday and Qusay Hussein, sons of Saddam Hussein, are killed by the U.S. military in Iraq, after being tipped off by an informant.
 July 26 – The electorate of the Cherokee Nation of Oklahoma approves a new constitution re-designating the tribe "Cherokee Nation" without "of Oklahoma" and specifically disenfranchising the Cherokee Freedmen.

August 
 August 1
The social network Myspace launches.
My Life as a Teenage Robot premieres on Nickelodeon.
 August 14 – A widespread power outage affects the northeastern United States and South-Central Canada.
 August 25 – The Spitzer Space Telescope was launched from Cape Canaveral, Florida, during Delta II.
 August 28 – Brian Douglas Wells, a pizza delivery man in Erie, Pennsylvania, is killed after a bomb fastened around his neck explodes. Wells was forced to rob a bank with the bomb collar on before it was detonated remotely.

September 
 September 7 – President Bush announces a request for $87 billion from Congress for military operations in Afghanistan and Iraq.
 September 17 – President Bush concedes there is no evidence linking Iraqi President Saddam Hussein to the September 11, 2001 attacks.
 September 18 – Hurricane Isabel makes landfall as a Category 2 Hurricane on North Carolina's Outer Banks. It directly kills 16 people in the Mid–Atlantic area.

October 
 October 7 – 2003 California gubernatorial recall election: Voters recall Governor Gray Davis from office and elect actor Arnold Schwarzenegger to succeed him.
 October 9 – A redesigned $20 bill is first released, containing many new security features not found in older bills.
 October 10 – Facing an investigation surrounding allegations of illegal drug use, American right-wing radio host Rush Limbaugh publicly admits that he is addicted to prescription pain killers, and will seek treatment.
 October 15 – The 2003 Staten Island Ferry crash kills 11 after one of its ferries slams into a pier.
 October 25
 The Florida Marlins defeat the New York Yankees to win their second World Series title.
 The Cedar Fire begins in San Diego County, burning 280,000 acres (1,100 km2), 2,232 homes and killing 14.

November 
 November 1 – Walt Disney Pictures' 44th feature film, Brother Bear, is released to box office success but mixed-to-negative critical reception.
 November 7 – Elf, directed by Jon Favreau, is released in theaters.
 November 18
 The Massachusetts Supreme Judicial Court, in Goodridge v. Department of Public Health, rules anti-gay laws against same-sex marriage unconstitutional in Massachusetts.
 U.S. President George W. Bush makes a state visit to London in the midst of massive anti-war protests.
 November 20 – Iraq War: End of Operation Iron Hammer, an attempt to end the Iraq insurgency.

December 
 December 1 – Boeing chairman and CEO Phil Condit resigns unexpectedly. He is replaced by Lewis Platt as non-executive chairman and Harry Stonecipher as president and CEO.
 December 13 – Iraq War: End of Operation Red Dawn, resulting in the capture of Saddam Hussein in Tikrit.
 December 19 – After being arrested, Guatemalan Ricardo Alfonso Cerna commits suicide at a police station in San Bernardino County, California by shooting himself in the head with a concealed handgun.
 December 22 – The 6.6  San Simeon earthquake shook the central coast of California with a maximum Mercalli intensity of VIII (Severe), leaving two dead and 40 injured, and causing $250–300 million in damage.
 December 24 
 At the request of the U.S. Embassy in Paris, the French government orders Air France to cancel several flights between France and the U.S. in response to terrorism concerns.
 A BSE (mad cow disease) outbreak in Washington state is announced. Several countries including Brazil, Australia, and Taiwan ban the import of beef from the United States.
 December 31 – British Airways Flight 223, a Boeing 747-400 flying from London Heathrow to Washington Dulles, is held for security checks after landing in Washington, D.C. due to intelligence suggesting a terrorist threat.

Ongoing 
 Iraqi no-fly zones (1991–2003)
 War in Afghanistan (2001–2021)
 Iraq War (2003–2011)

Undated 
Emerson USA, a California based flag manufacturer is founded.
GenSpera, a pharmaceutical company, is founded in San Antonio, Texas.
Go-To Transport company is founded in Bay City, Michigan.
J.L. Weigand Jr. Notre Dame Legal Education Trust is established in Kansas.
The Ring of McAllister, a mystery novel and SAT preparatory book, is published.
Words Beats & Life, a hip-hop non-profit organization, is formed.

Births

January 

 January 1 – Nikhil Kumar, table tennis player
 January 2 – Cyrus Arnold, actor
 January 3
 Mitchell Budler, soccer player
 Kyle Rittenhouse, defendant acquitted of the Kenosha unrest shooting
 Joseph Zalinsky, soccer player
 January 4 
 Aleah Finnegan, gymnast
 Jaeden Martell, actor
 January 5 – Sean Bettenhausen, soccer player
 January 6 – MattyBRaps, singer/songwriter, rapper, and dancer
 January 7 – Abel Mendoza, soccer player
 January 9 
 Tyler Freeman, soccer player
 Ricardo Pepi, soccer player
 January 11 – Sota Kitahara, soccer player
 January 12 – Luc Granitur, soccer player
 January 13 
 Christopher Garcia, soccer player
 Toby Kodat, tennis player
 Roald Mitchell, soccer player
 Reece Ushijima, Japanese-American racing driver
 January 14 – Brittain Gottlieb, soccer player
 January 16
 Tyler Boucher, hockey player
 Diana Davis, American-born Russian ice dancer
 January 18 – Jonathan Perez, soccer player
 January 19 – Katherine Valli, para badminton player
 January 20 – J. J. McCarthy, football player
 January 21 – Garren Stitt, actor and singer
 January 22 – Michael Halliday, soccer player
 January 23
 Adrián González, soccer player
 Selmir Miscic, soccer player
 January 24 – Felix Barajas, soccer player
 January 27 
 Cooper Kinney, baseball player
 Gabriella Marte, American-born Dominican footballer 
 Paul Son, soccer player
 January 28 – Carson Hocevar, dirt track and stock car racing driver

February 

 February 1 – Sydney Mikayla, actress
 February 2 – Dusty Henricksen, freestyle snowboarder
 February 4 – Kyla Kenedy, actress
 February 5 – Anthony Ramos, soccer player
 February 10 
 Max Christie, basketball player
 Mauricio Cuevas, soccer player
 Sebastian Hernandez, soccer player
 February 13 – Tyler Wolff, soccer player
 February 15 – Tamari Davis, sprinter
 February 16 
 Matthew Edwards, soccer player
 Kayden Pierre, soccer player
 February 20 
 Kristina García, American-born Dominican footballer
 Olivia Rodrigo, singer and actress
 February 21
 Harry Ford, baseball player
 Samantha Gordon, football and soccer player
 February 22 
 Isra Hirsi, climate activist and daughter of U.S. Congresswoman Ilhan Omar
 Yuven Sundaramoorthy, racing driver
 February 25
 Isaac Homer, soccer player
 Morris Matthews, soccer player
 February 26 – Ethan Hardin, soccer player
 February 28 – Hope Rose, indoor and field hockey player

March 
 March 1
 Cesar Cuellar, soccer player
 Yasmeen Fletcher, actress
 March 6 – Millicent Simmonds, actress 
 March 8 
 Montana Jordan, actor
 Gavin Krenecki, soccer player
 Ethan Peters, beauty blogger, makeup artist, and social media personality (d. 2020)
 March 9 
 Andres Cardenas, soccer player
 Sunisa Lee, gymnast
 March 10 
 Sebastian Nava, soccer player
 Gabriella Pizzolo, actress and singer
 Elijah Wynder, soccer player
 March 11 – Mikaela Jenkins, Paralympic swimmer
 March 12 
 Ashley Lin, Chinese-American figure skater
 Malina Weissman, actress and model
 March 15 – Quinn Ewers, football player
 March 17 – Dante Huckaby, soccer player
 March 19 – Chase Stillman, American-born Canadian ice hockey player
 March 20 – Alex Monis, soccer player
 March 22 – Eric Kinzner, soccer player
 March 23 – Jacob Greene, soccer player
 March 26 – Bhad Bhabie, rapper, songwriter, and internet personality
 March 27 – Grant Hampton, soccer player

April 

 April 1 – Jeremy Garay, soccer player
 April 3 – Elsie Fisher, actress 
 April 4 – Chase Petty, baseball player
 April 5 
 Jordan Bowers, gymnast
 Esequiel Coronel, soccer player
 Boima Cummins, soccer player
 April 9 
 Awonder Liang, chess prodigy
 Hayley Faith Negrin, actress
 April 10 – Andrew Painter, baseball player
 April 11 – Blake Pope, soccer player
 April 12 – Omar Salim, American-born Hungarian taekwondo athlete
 April 16
 Brynn Cartelli, singer
 Kahlil Watson, baseball player
 April 17 – Dante Sealy, soccer player
 April 19
 Caleel Harris, child actor and voice actor
 Jackson Merrill, baseball player
 April 22 – Vladimir Walent, soccer player
 April 23 – Griffin Dillon, soccer player
 April 28 – Daniel Edelman, soccer player
 April 29 
 Mitchell Ferguson, soccer player
 AJ Francois, American-born Dominican footballer

May 

 May 1 – Lizzy Greene, actress
 May 2 – Chaz Lucius, ice hockey player
 May 5 – Danny Leyva, soccer player
 May 7 – Kevin Paredes, soccer player
 May 10
 Marcus Ferkranus, soccer player
 Gavin George, classical pianist
 May 11
 Kendall Brown, basketball player
 Daniel Flores, soccer player
 May 13 
 Jaxson Dart, football player
 Jabari Smith Jr., basketball player
 May 14 – Javier Casas, soccer player
 May 15 – Max Kaeser, race car driver
 May 16
 Annie Flood, Paralympic volleyball player
 Collin McCamy, soccer player
 Cole Sillinger, American-born Canadian ice hockey player
 Bryan Okoh, American-born Swiss professional footballer
 May 19 – JoJo Siwa, dancer, singer, actress, and YouTube personality
 May 21 – Erwin Martínez, soccer player
 May 24
 Cristian Zaragoza, soccer player
 Rose Zhang, golfer
 May 27 – Caden Clark, soccer player

June 

 June 1 – Emjay Anthony, actor and model
 June 2 – Jeremy Ray Taylor, actor
 June 3 – Nathan Bittle, basketball player
 June 4 – Brady House, baseball player
 June 11 – Breanna Yde, actress
 June 17
 Brian Gutiérrez, soccer player
 Elizabeth Yeager, indoor and field hockey player
 June 19 – Frank Mozzicato, baseball player
 June 20 – Hans Niemann, chess grandmaster
 June 21 – Issa Mudashiru, soccer player
 June 23 – Cole Dewhurst, soccer player
 June 24 – Marcus Fiesel, murder victim (d. 2006)
 June 25 – Carson Williams, baseball player
 June 26 – Sam Mayer, stock car racing driver
 June 28 – Joshua Baez, baseball player
 June 29 – Alexys Nycole Sanchez, child actress
 June 30 – Fabrizio Bernal, soccer player

July 

 July 1
 Storm Reid, actress 
 Brynn Rumfallo, reality television cast member and dancer
 July 5 – Terrell Ransom Jr., actor
 July 7 – Jack McGlynn, soccer player
 July 8 – Major Dodson, actor
 July 11 – Sydney Lucas, child actress
 July 12 – Jax Malcolm, actor
 July 13 – Wyatt Oleff, actor
 July 15 – Taylor Richardson, activist
 July 19
 Tyler Downs, Olympic diver and social media personality
 Jacob Steinmetz, baseball player
 July 21 – Marvin Gamez, soccer player
 July 29 – Alejandro Alvarado Jr., soccer player

August 

 August 5 – Arquimides Ordonez, soccer player
 August 6 – Brandon Huntley-Hatfield, basketball player
 August 8 – Adam Lundegard, soccer player
 August 10 – Joshua Saavedra, soccer player
 August 14 – Tega Ikoba, soccer player
 August 15 – Coby Jones, soccer player
 August 18 
 Max Charles, actor 
 Hailey Owens, murder victim (d. 2014)
 August 22 – Christian Nydegger, soccer player
 August 24
 Jalen Neal, soccer player
 Andre Zuluaga, soccer player
 August 25 – AJ Griffin, basketball player
 August 26
 Paxten Aaronson, soccer player
 Trevor Keels, basketball player
 Emma Rayne Lyle, actress
 August 28
 Lexi Underwood, actress
 Quvenzhané Wallis, actress

September 

 September 1 – Jonathan Gómez, soccer player
 September 2 – Cristian Nava, soccer player
 September 3 
 Jack Dylan Grazer, actor 
 Eileen Gu, Chinese-American freestyle skier
 September 6 – Sean McTague, soccer player
 September 7 – Diego Luna, soccer player
 September 8 – Curtis De Leon, Trinidadian-American soccer player
 September 9 – Luke Hughes, ice hockey player
 September 10 – Carissa Yip, chess player
 September 14 – Lateef Omidiji, soccer player
 September 18 – Aidan Gallagher, actor 
 September 26 – Hanna Harrell, figure skater
 September 28 – Caden Stafford, soccer player
 September 30 – Martin Damm, tennis player

October 

 October 3 – Caroline Green, ice dancer
 October 8 – Ángela Aguilar, Mexican-American singer 
 October 12 – Michael Lenis, soccer player
 October 14
 Cade Cowell, soccer player
 Raymond Drai, soccer player
 October 15 – Chris Livingston, basketball player
 October 20 – Sophia Gennusa, child actress
 October 24 – Hudson Yang, actor
 October 25 – Tegan Marie, country singer and songwriter
 October 27 – Gavin Lewis, actor
 October 31 – Gerardo Dúran, soccer player

November 
 November 12 – Jett Noland, racing driver
 November 14 – Brandon Jacobson, chess grandmaster
 November 18 – Justin Che, soccer player
 November 20 – Brieana Hallo, American-born Dominican footballer
 November 21 – Ellie Stokes, American-born Saint Kitts and Nevis footballer

December 
 December 1 – Jackson Nicoll, child actor
 December 2 – Evie Clair, musical artist and reality television personality
 December 4 – Jack Jasinski, soccer player
 December 5 – Logan Robot Gladden, musician
 December 9 – Faith Torrez, gymnast
 December 10 – Colin Duffy, professional climber
 December 14 – Kate Finster, pair skater
 December 30 – Nicolette Pierini, child actress

Deaths

January 

 January 3 – Sid Gillman, American football player, coach and executive (b. 1911)
 January 4 – Sabine Ulibarrí, poet and critic (b. 1919)
 January 11 – Richard Simmons, actor (b. 1913)
 January 12 – Dean Amadon, ornithologist (b. 1912)
 January 15 – Doris Fisher, singer and songwriter (b. 1915)
 January 17 – Richard Crenna, actor (b. 1926)
 January 20
 Al Hirschfeld, cartoonist (b. 1903)
 Craig Kelly, snowboarder (b. 1966)
 January 23 – Nell Carter, singer and actress (b. 1948)
 January 29 – Frank Moss, former United States Senator from Utah (b. 1911)

February 

 February 1 – crew of the Space Shuttle Columbia on mission STS-107:
 Michael P. Anderson, astronaut (b. 1959)
 David M. Brown, astronaut and physician (b. 1956)
 Kalpana Chawla, India-born American astronaut and aerospace engineer (b. 1961)
 Laurel Clark, astronaut and physician (b. 1961)
 Rick Husband, commander astronaut (b. 1957)
 William McCool, astronaut (b. 1961)
 Ilan Ramon, Israeli fighter pilot and astronaut (b. 1954)
 February 2 – Lou Harrison, American composer (b. 1917)
 February 10
 Edgar de Evia, Mexican-born American photographer (b. 1910)
 Ron Ziegler, White House Press Secretary (b. 1939)
 Curt Hennig, American wrestler (b. 1958)
 February 16 – Eleanor "Sis" Daley, wife of Chicago mayor Richard J. Daley (b. 1907)
 February 19 – Johnny Paycheck, American singer and songwriter (b. 1938)
 February 20 – Orville Freeman, 29th Governor of Minnesota from 1955 through1959 (b. 1918)
 February 21 – Julie Mitchum, American actress (b. 1914)
 February 23 – Howie Epstein, American musician and producer (b. 1955)
 February 27 – Fred Rogers, American educator, minister, songwriter, writer, and television host (b. 1928)

March 

 March 2 – Hank Ballard, American singer and songwriter (b. 1927)
 March 3 – Ann A. Bernatitus, American U.S. Navy nurse (b. 1912)
 March 9 – Stan Brakhage, American filmmaker (b. 1933)
 March 12
 Howard Fast, American novelist (b. 1914)
 Lynne Thigpen, American actress (b. 1948)
 March 14 – Amanda Davis, American writer and teacher (b. 1971)
 March 16 – Rachel Corrie, American activist and diarist (b. 1979)
 March 20 – Sailor Art Thomas, American bodybuilder and wrestler (b. 1924)
 March 22 – Milton G. Henschel, American minister and executive (b. 1920)
 March 26 – Daniel Patrick Moynihan, American politician (b. 1926)
 March 30 – Michael Jeter, American actor (b. 1952)
 March 31 - Anne Gwynne, American actress (b. 1918)

April 

 April 2 – Edwin Starr American soul singer (b. 1942)
 April 4 – Anthony Caruso, American actor (b. 1916)
 April 8 – Bing Russell, American actor (b. 1926)
 April 11 – Cecil Howard Green, British-American geophysicist and businessman (b. 1900)
 April 17
 Robert Atkins, American physician (b. 1930)
 Paul Getty, American-born British philanthropist (b. 1932)
 Earl King, American singer, songwriter, and guitarist (b. 1934)
 April 20 – Ruth Hale, writer and actress (b. 1908)
 April 21 – Nina Simone, American singer, songwriter, pianist, arranger, and civil rights activist (b. 1933)
 April 22 – Mike Larrabee, American Olympic athlete (b. 1933)
 April 26 – Peter Stone, American screenwriter (b. 1930)

May 

 May 1 – Miss Elizabeth, American wrestling manager and valet (b. 1960)
 May 3 – Suzy Parker, American model and actress (b. 1932)
 May 9 
 Carmen Filpi, American actor (b. 1923)
 Russell B. Long, American politician (b. 1918)
 May 14 – Robert Stack, American actor and television host (b. 1919)
 May 15 – June Carter Cash, American singer, dancer, songwriter, actress, comedian, and writer (b. 1929)
 May 17 – Pop Ivy, American-Canadian football player and coach (b. 1916)
 May 26 – Kathleen Winsor, American writer (b. 1919)
 May 28 – Martha Scott, American actress (b. 1912)

June 

 June 2
 Fred Blassie, American wrestler and manager (b. 1918)
 Dick Cusack, American actor, filmmaker and humorist (b. 1925)
 Burke Marshall, American civil rights lawyer (b. 1922)
 June 6 – Ken Grimwood, American writer (b. 1944)
 June 10 – Donald Regan, 66th United States Secretary (b. 1918)
 June 11 – David Brinkley, American television journalist (b. 1920)
 June 12 – Gregory Peck, American actor (b. 1916)
 June 14 – Jimmy Knepper, American musician (b. 1927)
 June 15 – Hume Cronyn, Canadian-American actor (b. 1911)
 June 18 – Larry Doby, American baseball player and manager (b. 1923)
 June 20 – Bob Stump, American politician (b. 1927)
 June 21 – Leon Uris, American writer (b. 1924)
 June 23 – Maynard Jackson, American politician (b. 1938)
 June 25 – Lester Maddox, American politician (b. 1915)
 June 26 – Strom Thurmond, American politician (b. 1902)
 June 29 – Katharine Hepburn, American actress (b. 1907)
 June 30 – Buddy Hackett, American comedian and actor (b. 1924)

July 

 July 1 – Herbie Mann, musician (b. 1930)
 July 4 – Barry White, singer and songwriter (b. 1944)
 July 6 – Buddy Ebsen, actor and dancer (b. 1908)
 July 12 – Benny Carter, musician (b. 1907)
 July 15 – Tex Schramm, American football executive (b. 1920)
 July 16
 Celia Cruz, Cuban-American singer (b. 1925)
 Carol Shields, American-born Canadian writer (b. 1935)
 July 17 – Rosalyn Tureck, pianist and harpsichordist (b. 1913)
 July 25 – Erik Brann, American musician (b. 1950)
 July 27 – Bob Hope, English-American actor, singer, dancer, and comedian (b. 1903)
 July 28 – Greg Guidry, American singer-songwriter (b. 1954)
 July 30 – Sam Phillips, record producer (b. 1923)

August 

 August 3 – Roger Voudouris, American singer-songwriter and guitarist (b. 1954) 
 August 4 – Frederick Chapman Robbins, American Nobel pediatrician and virologist (b. 1916)
 August 6 – Julius Baker, American flute player (b. 1915)
 August 9 – Gregory Hines, American actor, singer, dancer, and choreographer (b. 1946)
 August 11 – Herb Brooks, American hockey player and coach (b. 1937)
 August 21 – Wesley Willis, American musician (b. 1963)
 August 23 – Bobby Bonds, American baseball player (b. 1946)
 August 26 – Wilma Burgess, American country musician (b. 1939)
 August 28 – Brian Douglas Wells, criminal and murder victim (b. 1956)
 August 30 – Charles Bronson, American actor (b. 1921)

September 

 September 1
 Rand Brooks, American actor (b. 1918)
 John Gould, American humorist, essayist, and columnist (b. 1908)
 September 3 – Ma Dunjing, Chinese General, died in Los Angeles, California (b. 1910)
 September 6 – Harry Goz, American actor (b. 1932)
 September 7 – Warren Zevon, American singer, songwriter, and musician (b. 1947)
 September 9
 Larry Hovis, American actor (b. 1936)
 Edward Teller, Hungarian-American physicist (b. 1908)
 September 11
 Joe Hall Morris, American oral surgeon and university educator (b. 1922)
 John Ritter, American actor and comedian (b. 1948)
 September 12 – Johnny Cash, American singer, songwriter, musician, and actor (b. 1932)
 September 13 – Frank O'Bannon, 47th Governor of Indiana from 1997 to 2003. (b. 1930)
 September 14 – John Serry Sr., Italian-American musician (b. 1915)
 September 16 – Sheb Wooley, American actor, singer, and songwriter (b. 1921)
 September 22 – Gordon Jump, American actor (b. 1932)
 September 25
 Franco Modigliani, Italian-American Nobel economist (b. 1918)
 George Plimpton, American journalist, writer, and actor (b. 1927)
 Edward Said, Palestinian-American literary critic (b. 1935)
 September 26 – Shawn Lane, American musician (b. 1963)
 September 27 – Donald O'Connor, American actor, singer, and dancer (b. 1925)
 September 28
 Althea Gibson, American tennis player (b. 1927)
 Elia Kazan, Greek-American director (b. 1909)
 September 30 – Robert Kardashian, American attorney and businessman (b. 1944)

October 

 October 3 – William Steig, American cartoonist, illustrator, and writer (b. 1907)
 October 5
 Neil Postman, American writer, media theorist, and cultural critic (b. 1931)
 Timothy Treadwell, American enthusiast, environmentalist, amateur naturalist, and documentary film maker (b. 1957)
 October 10 – Eugene Istomin, American pianist (b. 1925)
 October 12 – Willie Shoemaker, American jockey (b. 1931)
 October 17 – Janice Rule, American actress (b. 1931)
 October 19
 Margaret Murie, American environmentalist and author (b. 1902)
 Road Warrior Hawk, American professional wrestler (b. 1957)
 October 20 – Jack Elam, American actor (b. 1920)
 October 21
 Fred Berry, American actor (b. 1951)
 Elliott Smith, American singer, songwriter, and musician (b. 1969)
 October 22 – Tony Renna, American race car driver (b. 1976)
 October 25 – Robert Strassburg, American conductor, composer, musicologist, and music educator (b. 1915)
 October 27 – Rod Roddy, American television announcer (b. 1937)
 October 29 – Hal Clement, American writer (b. 1922)
 October 31 – Richard Neustadt, American political scientist (b. 1919)

November 

 November 5
 Dorothy Fay, American actress (b. 1915)
 Bobby Hatfield, American singer (b. 1940)
 November 6
 Crash Holly, American wrestler (b. 1971)
 Spider Jorgensen, American baseball player and coach (b. 1919)
 November 9 – Art Carney, American actor (b. 1918)
 November 10 – Irv Kupcinet, American columnist and television personality (b. 1912)
 November 12
 Jonathan Brandis, American actor, director, and screenwriter (b. 1976)
 Kay E. Kuter, American actor (b. 1925)
 Penny Singleton, American actress (b. 1908)
 November 13 – Kellie Waymire, American actress (b. 1967)
 November 14 – Gene Anthony Ray, American actor, dancer, and choreographer (b. 1962)
 November 15 
 Dorothy Loudon, American actress and singer (b. 1925)
 Laurence Tisch, American businessman, co-founded the Loews Corporation (b. 1923)
 Speedy West, American guitarist and producer (b. 1924)
 November 17 – Don Gibson, American country musician (b. 1928)
 November 18
 Patricia Broderick, American playwright and painter (b. 1925)
 Michael Kamen, American composer, conductor, and songwriter (b. 1948)
 November 20 – Jim Siedow, American actor (b. 1920)
 November 24 – Warren Spahn, American baseball player (b. 1921)
 November 26 – Soulja Slim, American rapper, songwriter, and murder victim (b. 1977)
 November 30 – Gertrude Ederle, American swimmer (b. 1905)

December 

 December 3 – Ellen Drew, American actress (b. 1915)
 December 4 – Iggy Katona, American race car driver (b. 1916)
 December 7
 Carl F. H. Henry, American theologian and publisher (b. 1913)
 Azie Taylor Morton, 36th Treasurer of the United States (b. 1936)
 December 9 – Paul Simon, American politician (b. 1928)
 December 13 – William Roth, American politician (b. 1921)
 December 14 – Jeanne Crain, American actress (b. 1925)
 December 15 – George Fisher, American political cartoonist (b. 1923)
 December 16 – Gary Stewart, American singer, songwriter, and musician (b. 1944)
 December 17 – Otto Graham, American football player and coach (b. 1921)
 December 19 – Hope Lange, American actress (b. 1933)
 December 22 – Dave Dudley, American singer (b. 1928)
 December 27
 Iván Calderón, Puerto Rican-American baseball player (b. 1962)
 Pete Alvarado, American animator and comic book artist (b. 1920)
 December 29 – Earl Hindman, American actor (b. 1942)
 December 30 – John Gregory Dunne, American writer, screenwriter, literary critic, and journalist (b. 1932)

See also 
 2003 in American soccer
 2003 in American television
 List of American films of 2003
 Timeline of United States history (1990–2009)

References

External links
 

 
2000s in the United States
United States
United States
Years of the 21st century in the United States